An oil burner engine is a steam engine that uses oil as its fuel. The term is usually applied to a locomotive or ship engine that burns oil to heat water, to produce the steam which drives the pistons, or turbines, from which the power is derived.

This is mechanically very different from diesel engines, which use internal combustion, although they are sometimes colloquially referred to as oil burners.

History
A variety of experimental oil powered steam boilers were patented in the 1860s. Most of the early patents used steam to spray atomized oil into the steam boilers furnace. Attempts to burn oil from a free surface were unsuccessful due to the inherently low rates of combustion from the available surface area.  

On 21 April 1868, the steam yacht Henrietta made a voyage down the river Clyde powered by an oil fired boiler designed and patented by a Mr Donald of George Miller & Co.  Donald's design used a jet of dry steam to spray oil into a furnace lined with fireproof bricks. Prior to the Henrietta’s oil burner conversion, George Miller & Co was recorded as having used oil to power their works in Glasgow for a “considerable time”.  

During the late 19th century numerous burner designs were patented using combinations of steam, compressed air and injection pumps to spray oil into boiler furnaces. Most of the early oil burner designs were commercial failures due to the high cost of oil (relative to coal) rather than any technical issues with the burners themselves.

Steam ships
In the 1870s, Caspian steamships began using mazut, a residual fuel oil which at that time was produced as a waste stream by the many oil refineries located in the Absheron peninsula. During the late 19th century Mazut remained cheap and plentiful in the Caspian region.   

In 1870, either the SS Iran or SS Constantine (depending on source) became the first ship to convert to burning fuel oil, both were Caspian based merchant steamships.  

During the 1870s, the Imperial Russian Navy converted the ships of the Caspian fleet to oil burners starting with the Khivenets in 1874.

In 1894, the oil tanker SS Baku Standard became the first oil burning vessel to cross the Atlantic Ocean.  In 1903, the Red Star Liner SS Kensington became the first passenger liner to make the Atlantic crossing with boilers fired by fuel oil.
  
Fuel oil has a higher energy density than coal and oil powered ships did not need to employ stokers however coal remained the dominant power source for marine boilers throughout the 19th century primarily due to the relatively high cost of fuel oil. Oil was used in marine boilers to a greater extent during the early 20th century. By 1939, about half the world’s ships burned fuel oil, of these about half had steam engines and the other half used diesel engines.

Steam locomotives
Oil burners designed by Thomas Urquhart were fitted to the locomotives of the Gryazi-Tsaritsyn railway in southern Russia. Thomas Urquhart, who was employed as a Locomotive Superintendent by the Gryazi-Tsaritsyn Railway Company, began his experiments in 1874.  By 1885 all the locomotives of the Gryazi-Tsaritsyn Railway had been converted to run on fuel oil.  

In Great Britain, an early pioneer of oil burning railway locomotives was James Holden, of the Great Eastern Railway. In James Holden's system, steam was raised by burning coal before the oil fuel was turned on. Holden's first oil burning locomotive Petrolea, was a class T19 2-4-0.  Built in 1893, Petrolea burned waste oil that the railway had previously been discharging into the River Lea. Due to the relatively low cost of coal, oil was rarely used on Britain's streamtrains and in most cases only where there was a shortage of coal.

In the United States, the first oil burning steam locomotive was in service on the Southern Pacific railroad by 1900. By 1915 there were 4,259 oil burning steam locomotives in the United States, which represented 6.5% of all the locomotives then in service. Most oil burners were operated in areas west of the Mississippi where oil was abundant. American usage of oil burning steam locomotives peaked in 1945 when they were responsible for around 20% of all the fuel consumed (measured by energy content) during rail freight operations. After WW2, both oil and coal burning steam locomotives were replaced by more efficient diesel engines and had been almost entirely phased out of service by 1960.

Notable early oil-fired steamships

Passenger liners
 SS Kensington
 NMS Regele Carol I  (one oil fired + one coal fired boiler)
 SS Tenyo Maru 
 SS George Washington

Warships

 Re Umberto-class - Italian ironclad battleships equipped to burn a mix of coal and oil   
 Rostislav - Russian battleship
 HMS Spiteful - British Royal Navy destroyer
 Paulding-class destroyers - US Navy

Notable oil-fired steam locomotives

General
 Most cab forward locomotives
 Some Fairlie locomotives
 Some steam locomotives used on heritage railways
 Advanced steam technology locomotives

Australia
 NSWGR D55 Class
 NSWGR D59 Class
 VR J Class
 VR R Class
 WAGR U Class
 WAGR Pr Class

India
 Darjeeling Himalayan Railway
 Nilgiri Mountain Railway

Great Britain
GER Class T19
GER Class P43
GWR 101 Class

New Zealand
NZR JA class (North British-built locomotives only)
NZR JB class
NZR K class (1932) - converted from coal 1947-53
NZR KA class  - converted from coal 1947-53

North America

 Sierra Railway 3 - Part of Railtown 1897 State Historic Park (Jamestown, CA)
 Sierra Railway 28 - Part of Railtown 1897 State Historic Park  (Jamestown, CA)
 McCloud Railway 25 - Oregon Coast Scenic Railroad (Garibaldi, OR)
 Everett Railroad 11 - Everett Railroad (Hollidaysburg, PA)
 California Western 45 - California Western Railroad (Fort Bragg, CA)
 Great Smoky Mountains Railroad 1702 - Great Smoky Mountains Railroad (Bryson City, NC)
 Union Pacific 844 - UP Heritage Fleet (Cheyenne, WY)
 Union Pacific 4014 - UP Heritage Fleet (Cheyenne,WY)
 Union Pacific 3985 - Railroading Heritage of Midwest America (Silvis, IL)
 Union Pacific 5511 - Railroading Heritage of Midwest America (Silvis, IL)
 Union Pacific 737 - Double-T Agricultural Museum (Stevinson, CA)
 White Pass & Yukon Route 69 - White Pass & Yukon Route (Skagway, AK)
 White Pass & Yukon Route 73 - White Pass & Yukon Route (Skagway, AK)
 Santa Fe 5000 - Amarillo, TX
 Santa Fe 3759 - Locomotive Park (Kingman, AR)
 Santa Fe 3751 - San Bernardino Railroad Historical Society (San Bernardino, CA)
 Santa Fe 3450 - RailGiants Train Museum (Pomona, CA)
 Santa Fe 3415 - Abilene & Smoky Valley Railroad (Abilene, KS)
 Santa Fe 2926 - New Mexico Steam Locomotive & Railroad Historical Society (Albuquerque, NM)
 Santa Fe 1316 - Texas State Railroad (Palestine, TX)
 Texas & Pacific 316 - Texas State Railroad (Palestine, TX)
 Texas & Pacific 610 - Texas State Railroad (Palestine, TX)
 Southern Pine Lumber Co. 28 - Texas State Railroad (Palestine, TX)
 Tremont & Gulf 30/Magma Arizona 7 - Texas State Railroad (Palestine, TX)
 Oregon Railroad & Navigation 197 - Oregon Rail Heritage Center (Portland, OR)
 Spokane, Portland & Seattle 700 - Oregon Rail Heritage Center (Portland, OR)
 Southern Pacific 4449 - Oregon Rail Heritage Center (Portland, OR)
 Southern Pacific 4460 - National Museum of Transportation (Kirkwood, MO)
 Southern Pacific 4294 - California State Railroad Museum (Sacramento, CA)
 Southern Pacific 2479 - California Trolley & Railroad Corporation
 Southern Pacific 2472 - Golden Gate Railroad Museum
 Southern Pacific 2467 - Pacific Locomotive Association, Inc.
 Southern Pacific 2353 - Pacific Southwest Railway Museum (Campo, CA)
 Southern Pacific 2248 - Grapevine Vintage Railroad (Grapevine, TX)
 Southern Pacific 1744 -  Niles Canyon Railway (Sunol, CA)
 Southern Pacific 786 - Austin Steam Train Association, Inc. (Cedar Park, TX)
 Southern Pacific 745 - Louisiana Steam Train Association, Inc. (Jefferson, LA)
 Southern Pacific 18 - Eastern California Museum (Independence, CA)
 Cotton Belt 819 - Arkansas Railroad Museum (Pine Bluff, AR)
 Frisco 1522 - National Museum of Transportation (Kirkwood, MO)
 Southern Railway 401 - Monticello Railway Museum (Monticello, IL)
 Durango & Silverton Class K-28 473 and 476 - Durango & Silverton Narrow Gauge Railroad (Durango, CO)
 Durango & Silverton Class K-36 480 and 482 - Durango & Silverton Narrow Gauge Railroad (Durango, CO)
 Durango & Silverton Class K-37 493 - Durango & Silverton Narrow Gauge Railroad (Durango, CO)
 Cumbres & Toltec Class K-36 489 - Cumbres & Toltec Scenic Railroad (Chama, NM)

See also
Oil refinery
Steam power during the Industrial Revolution
Timeline of steam power

References

External links
 Fuel energy & steam traction

Engine technology
Energy conversion
Combustion engineering
Steam engine technology